Jason Chan (born 12 December 1977) is a Hongkongese actor and television presenter. He started off at TVB hosting a variety of English Pearl lifestyle shows, which required the use of his proficiency in various languages: English, Cantonese, Mandarin, French, and Latin.

Life and career
Chan was born in Hong Kong to a Hakka distant family in the United Kingdom. He spent 3 years of his childhood in the UK before returning back to Hong Kong when he was 10. He is the second of four children. His eldest brother is a dentist and youngest brother is still in university. In the UK, Chan's family runs a Chinese restaurant. Chan received a bachelor's degree in modern and classical Chinese at the Hong Kong Polytechnic University, and a post-graduate diploma in economics at the University of Hong Kong. During university he had often helped out at his father's restaurant waiting tables, and had taken on various translation jobs. After graduation, Chan worked for two years in hospital management, before finally deciding on a career in TV.

In his first year in Hong Kong, Chan worked as an English tutor at his aunt's education centre. In 2005, Chan joined TVB and graduated from TVB's 20th Artist Training Class in 2006. The following few years, Chan hosted a lifestyle show on Pearl and anchored TVB Entertainment News, whilst at the same time taking on various roles in TV dramas. In 2010, Chan was offered his first major role in the sitcom, Be Home for Dinner (2011). In 2012, he was given his first leading role in the drama Missing You.

Since 2009, he had been rumoured to be dating Miss Chinese International 2007 winner Sarah Song, who lived at different towers within the same residential complex.
On 10 August 2014, Sarah posted a photo of herself and Jason Chan. The two were on a dinner together as a celebration of Sarah Song's 29th birthday. In the photo, the sweet couple were smiling happily as the former Miss China International contestant wraps her hand across the Jason's shoulders.

Sarah Song captioned her photo, saying, "Thank you for another birthday. More wonderful birthdays ahead...but hopefully not wrinkles."

This post was then regarded by the public as her confirmation that she is in fact in a relationship with Jason Chan.

In 2018, Jason left TVB. Sarah gave birth to their first baby.

Presenting works
Dolce Vita
TVB Entertainment News
Body Talks
Play N Chat
Mix & Match
Tung Wah Charity Show
Hong Kong Back Then

Filmography

Films

Television dramas

References

External links
Jason Chan at TVB Microblog
 
 

1977 births
Living people
Hong Kong people of Hakka descent
British people of Chinese descent
British people of Hong Kong descent
Hong Kong male television actors
Hong Kong male film actors
TVB actors
Hong Kong television presenters
British male television actors
British male film actors
British television presenters
Male actors from London
Alumni of SOAS University of London
British expatriates in Hong Kong